State Route 29 (SR-29) is a state highway in Emery County in the U.S. state of Utah.

Route description
SR-29 begins at the Emery County line, in the Manti-La Sal National Forest, paralleling the San Rafael River. Near the county line is also Joe's Valley State Park and Joe's Valley Reservoir, where the road diverts around the reservoir to the north, then resumes an east south-easterly course about  into Orangeville. Just west of Orangeville SR-29 intersects with SR-57. After Orangeville it continues about four miles (6 km) to where it terminates at the junction with State Route 10, four miles (6 km) east of Orangeville, and three miles (5 km) north of Castle Dale.

History
The road from SR-11 (by 1926 US-89) in Ephraim to SR-10 at Castle Dale Junction was added to the state highway system in 1915. The state legislature numbered it SR-29 in 1927, along with a branch from Orangeville Junction south to SR-10. The branch was split off as SR-57 in 1931. Due to the creation of Joe's Valley Reservoir, a new alignment was defined in 1965, adding about 4 miles (6.5 km) to the length; the legislature removed the portion west of the reservoir (Ephraim Canyon Road) from the state highway system in 1969.

Major intersections

References

029
 029